The Scottish cringe is a cultural cringe relating to Scotland, and claimed to exist by politicians and commentators.

These cultural commentators claim that a sense of cultural inferiority is felt by many Scots, particularly in relation to a perceived dominance of English or Anglocentric British culture, partly due to the importance of London within the United Kingdom, and consequently a sense of Scottish resentment and underachievement. The cringe is said to manifest as feelings of low self-worth and embarrassment felt by Scottish people in response to overt expressions of Scottish cultural identity and heritage such as the Lowland Scots and Scottish Gaelic languages, and the kilt (see Tartanry).

Former First Minister of Scotland Jack McConnell suggested in 2004 that the "Scottish cringe" included opposition to free-market capitalism and alleged that the cringe meant people felt "enterprise was even something to be ashamed of or embarrassed by".

See also
North Briton
Scotlandshire
Scottish national identity
Tartanry

References

External links
Scotland: cultural profile
 http://www.heraldscotland.com/comment/bloggers/why-we-scots-love-a-good-cultural-cringe.2012032669

Political history of Scotland
Political terminology
Scottish culture
Scottish society